There are 130 known photographs of Abraham Lincoln.

See also Wikipedia article on Tad Lincoln for the famous 1864 photograph of Abraham Lincoln with his son Tad, by Anthony Berger.

Notes

References

 Alt URL

Abraham Lincoln
Lists of photographs
Abraham Lincoln-related lists
Lincoln, Abraham
Photographs of the United States
Abraham Lincoln in art